NBA ShootOut 2002 is a video game developed by 989 Sports and published by Sony Computer Entertainment America for the PlayStation in 2001. A PlayStation 2 version was in development, but it was ultimately cancelled.

Reception

The game received "mixed" reviews according to the review aggregation website Metacritic.

References

External links
 

2001 video games
Basketball video games
Cancelled PlayStation 2 games
North America-exclusive video games
PlayStation (console) games
PlayStation (console)-only games
Video games developed in the United States
Video games set in 2002
Video games set in the United States